Brazil has the largest mammal diversity in the world, with more than 600 described species and more likely to be discovered. According to the International Union for Conservation of Nature, 66 of these species are endangered, and 40% of the threatened taxa belong to the primate group.

658 species are listed.

The following tags are used to highlight each species' conservation status as assessed by the International Union for Conservation of Nature:

Some species were assessed using an earlier set of criteria. Species assessed using this system have the following instead of near threatened and least concern categories:

Infraclass: Metatheria

Order: Didelphimorphia

 Family: Caluromyidae
 Genus: Caluromys
 Brown-eared woolly opossum, C. lanatus LC
 Bare-tailed woolly opossum, C. philander LC
 Family: Didelphidae
 Genus: Caluromysiops
 Black-shouldered opossum, Caluromysiops irrupta LC
 Genus: Glironia
 Bushy-tailed opossum, Glironia venusta LC
 Genus: Chironectes
 Water opossum, Chironectes minimus LC
 Genus: Didelphis
 White-eared opossum, Didelphis albiventris LC
 Big-eared opossum, Didelphis aurita LC
 Guianan white-eared opossum, Didelphis imperfecta LC
 Genus: Lutreolina
 Big lutrine opossum, Lutreolina crassicaudata LC
 Genus: Philander
 Anderson's four-eyed opossum, Philander andersoni LC
 Southeastern four-eyed opossum, Philander frenatus LC
 McIlhenny's four-eyed opossum, Philander mcilhennyi LC
 Gray four-eyed opossum, Philander opossum LC
 Genus: Gracilinanus
 Agile gracile opossum, Gracilinanus agilis LC
 Emilia's gracile opossum, Gracilinanus emiliae DD
 Brazilian gracile opossum, Gracilinanus microtarsus LC
 Genus: Marmosa
 White-bellied woolly mouse opossum, Marmosa constantiae LC
 Woolly mouse opossum, Marmosa demerarae LC
 Rufous mouse opossum, Marmosa lepida LC
 Linnaeus's mouse opossum, Marmosa murina LC
 Tate's woolly mouse opossum, Marmosa paraguayana LC
 Bare-tailed woolly mouse opossum, Marmosa regina LC
 Genus: Marmosops
 Tschudi's slender opossum, Marmosops impavidus LC
 Gray slender opossum, Marmosops incanus LC
 Neblina slender opossum, Marmosops neblina LC
 White-bellied slender mouse opossum, Marmosops noctivagus LC
 Delicate slender opossum, Marmosops parvidens LC
 Brazilian slender opossum, Marmosops paulensis LC
 Pinheiro's slender opossum, Marmosops pinheiroi LC
 Genus: Metachirus
 Brown four-eyed opossum, Metachirus nudicaudatus LC
 Genus: Monodelphis
 Northern three-striped opossum, Monodelphis americana LC
 Northern red-sided opossum, Monodelphis brevicaudata LC
 Yellow-sided opossum, Monodelphis dimidiata LC
 Gray short-tailed opossum, Monodelphis domestica LC
 Emilia's short-tailed opossum, Monodelphis emiliae LC
 Ihering's three-striped opossum, Monodelphis iheringi DD
 Pygmy short-tailed opossum, Monodelphis kunsi LC
 Marajó short-tailed opossum, Monodelphis maraxina DD
 Chestnut-striped opossum, Monodelphis rubida DD
 Long-nosed short-tailed opossum, Monodelphis scalops LC
 Southern red-sided opossum, Monodelphis sorex LC
 Southern three-striped opossum, Monodelphis theresa DD
 Red three-striped opossum, Monodelphis umbristriata VU
 One-striped opossum, Monodelphis unistriata CR
 Genus: Thylamys
 Dwarf fat-tailed mouse opossum, Thylamys velutinus LC

Infraclass: Eutheria

Order: Pilosa

 Family: Bradypodidae
 Genus: Bradypus
 Maned sloth, Bradypus torquatus VU
 Pale-throated sloth, Bradypus tridactylus LC
 Brown-throated sloth, Bradypus variegatus LC
 Family: Choloepodidae
 Genus: Choloepus
 Linnaeus's two-toed sloth, Choloepus didactylus LC
 Hoffmann's two-toed sloth, Choloepus hoffmanni LC

 Family Cyclopedidae
 Genus: Cyclopes
 Silky anteater, Cyclopes didactylus LC
 Family: Myrmecophagidae
 Genus: Myrmecophaga
 Giant anteater, Myrmecophaga tridactyla VU
 Genus: Tamandua
 Southern tamandua, Tamandua tetradactyla LC

Order: Cingulata

 Family: Dasypodidae
 Genus: Cabassous
 Greater naked-tailed armadillo, Cabassous tatouay LC
 Southern naked-tailed armadillo, Cabassous unicinctus LC
 Genus: Dasypus
 Southern long-nosed armadillo, Dasypus hybridus NT
 Great long-nosed armadillo, Dasypus kappleri LC
 Nine-banded armadillo, Dasypus novemcinctus LC
 Seven-banded armadillo, Dasypus septemcinctus LC
 Genus: Euphractus
 Six-banded armadillo, Euphractus sexcinctus LC
 Genus: Priodontes
 Giant armadillo, Priodontes maximus VU
 Genus: Tolypeutes
 Southern three-banded armadillo, Tolypeutes matacus NT
 Brazilian three-banded armadillo, Tolypeutes tricinctus VU

Order: Chiroptera
 Family: Emballonuridae
 Genus: Centronycteris
 Shaggy bat, Centronycteris maximiliani LR/lc
 Genus: Cormura
 Chestnut sac-winged bat, Cormura brevirostris LC
 Genus: Cyttarops
 Short-eared bat, Cyttarops alecto LC
 Genus: Diclidurus
 Northern ghost bat, Diclidurus albus LR/lc
 Greater ghost bat, Diclidurus ingens DD
 Isabelle's ghost bat, Diclidurus isabella LC
 Lesser ghost bat, Diclidurus scutatus LC
 Genus: Peropteryx
 Greater dog-like bat, Peropteryx kappleri LR/lc
 White-winged dog-like bat, Peropteryx leucoptera LC
 Lesser dog-like bat, Peropteryx macrotis LR/lc
 Pale-winged dog-like bat, Peropteryx pallidoptera 
 Genus: Rhynchonycteris
 Proboscis bat, Rhynchonycteris naso LR/lc
 Genus: Saccopteryx
 Greater sac-winged bat, Saccopteryx bilineata LC
 Frosted sac-winged bat, Saccopteryx canescens LC
 Amazonian sac-winged bat, Saccopteryx gymnura DD
 Lesser sac-winged bat, Saccopteryx leptura LC
 Family: Phyllostomidae
 Subfamily: Desmodontinae
 Genus: Desmodus
 Common vampire bat, Desmodus rotundus LC
 Genus: Diaemus
 White-winged vampire bat, Diaemus youngii LC
 Genus: Diphylla
 Hairy-legged vampire bat, Diphylla ecaudata LC
 Subfamily: Glossophaginae
 Genus: Anoura
 Tailed tailless bat, Anoura caudifer LC
 Geoffroy's tailless bat, Anoura geoffroyi LC
 Genus: Choeroniscus
 Minor long-nosed long-tongued bat, Choeroniscus minor LC
 Genus: Glossophaga
 Commissaris's long-tongued bat, Glossophaga commissarisi LR/lc
 Miller's long-tongued bat, Glossophaga longirostris DD
 Pallas's long-tongued bat, Glossophaga soricina LR/lc
 Genus: Hsunycteris
 Thomas's nectar bat, Hsunycteris thomasi LC
 Genus: Lichonycteris
 Dark long-tongued bat, Lichonycteris degener LR/lc
 Genus: Lionycteris
 Chestnut long-tongued bat, Lionycteris spurrelli LC
 Genus: Lonchophylla
 Bokermann's nectar bat, Lonchophylla bokermanni DD
 Dekeyser's nectar bat, Lonchophylla dekeyseri NT
 Lonchophylla inexpectata, Lonchophylla inexpectata
 Godman's nectar bat, Lonchophylla mordax LC
 Peracchi's nectar bat, Lonchophylla peracchii
 Genus: Scleronycteris
 Ega long-tongued bat, Scleronycteris ega LC
 Subfamily: Carolliinae
 Genus: Rhinophylla
 Fischer's little fruit bat, Rhinophylla fischerae LC
 Dwarf little fruit bat, Rhinophylla pumilio LC
 Genus: Carollia
 Benkeith's short-tailed bat, Carollia benkeithi
 Silky short-tailed bat, Carollia brevicauda LR/lc
 Seba's short-tailed bat, Carollia perspicillata LR/lc
 Little white-shouldered bat, Ametrida centurio LC
 Subfamily: Phyllostominae
 Genus: Chrotopterus
 Big-eared woolly bat, Chrotopterus auritus LR/lc
 Genus: Garnderycteris
 Striped hairy-nosed bat, Gardnerycteris crenulatum LR/lc
 Genus: Glyphonycteris
 Davies's big-eared bat, Glyphonycteris daviesi DD
 Tricolored big-eared bat, Glyphonycteris sylvestris LC
 Genus: Lampronycteris
 Yellow-throated big-eared bat, Lampronycteris brachyotis LC
 Genus: Lonchorhina
 Tomes's sword-nosed bat, Lonchorhina aurita LR/lc
 Northern sword-nosed bat, Lonchorhina inusitata DD
 Genus: Lophostoma
 Pygmy round-eared bat, Lophostoma brasiliense LR/lc
 Carriker's round-eared bat, Lophostoma carrikeri LC
 Schultz's round-eared bat, Lophostoma schulzi LC
 White-throated round-eared bat, Lophostoma silvicola LC
 Genus: Macrophyllum
 Long-legged bat, Macrophyllum macrophyllum LC
 Genus: Micronycteris
 Brosset's big-eared bat, Micronycteris brosseti DD
 Hairy big-eared bat, Micronycteris hirsuta LC
 Little big-eared bat, Micronycteris megalotis LC
 Common big-eared bat, Micronycteris microtis LC
 White-bellied big-eared bat, Micronycteris minuta LC
 Sanborn's big-eared bat, Micronycteris sanborni DD
 Schmidts's big-eared bat, Micronycteris schmidtorum LR/lc
 Genus: Mimon
 Golden bat, Mimon bennettii LC
 Genus: Neonycteris
 Least big-eared bat, Neonycteris pusilla VU
 Genus: Phylloderma
 Pale-faced bat, Phylloderma stenops LR/lc
 Genus: Phyllostomus
 Pale spear-nosed bat, Phyllostomus discolor LC
 Lesser spear-nosed bat, Phyllostomus elongatus LC
 Greater spear-nosed bat, Phyllostomus hastatus LC
 Guianan spear-nosed bat, Phyllostomus latifolius LC
 Genus: Tonatia
 Greater round-eared bat, Tonatia bidens DD
 Stripe-headed round-eared bat, Tonatia saurophila LR/lc
 Genus: Trachops
 Fringe-lipped bat, Trachops cirrhosus LC
 Genus: Trinycteris
 Niceforo's big-eared bat, Trinycteris nicefori LC
 Genus: Vampyrum
 Spectral bat, Vampyrum spectrum LR/nt
 Subfamily: Stenodermatinae
 Genus: Artibeus
 Brown fruit-eating bat, Artibeus concolor LC
 Fringed fruit-eating bat, Artibeus fimbriatus LC
 Great fruit-eating bat, Artibeus lituratus LC
 Dark fruit-eating bat, Artibeus obscurus LC
 Flat-faced fruit-eating bat, Artibeus planirostris LR/lc
 Genus: Chiroderma
 Brazilian big-eyed bat, Chiroderma doriae LC
 Salvin's big-eyed bat, Chiroderma salvini LR/lc
 Little big-eyed bat, Chiroderma trinitatum LC
 Hairy big-eyed bat, Chiroderma villosum LR/lc
 Vizotto's big-eyed bat, Chiroderma vizottoi LR/lc
 Genus: Dermanura
 Andersen's fruit-eating bat, Dermanura anderseni LC
 Bogota fruit-eating bat, Dermanura bogotensis
 Gervais's fruit-eating bat, Dermanura cinerea LC
 Gnome fruit-eating bat, Artibeus gnoma LC
 Genus: Mesophylla
 MacConnell's bat, Mesophylla macconnelli LC
 Genus: Platyrrhinus
 Slender broad-nosed bat, Platyrrhinus angustirostris
 Eldorado broad-nosed bat, Platyrrhinus aurarius
 Short-headed broad-nosed bat, Platyrrhinus brachycephalus LC
 Brown-bellied broad-nosed bat, Platyrrhinus fusciventris
 Heller's broad-nosed bat, Platyrrhinus helleri LC
 Incan broad-nosed bat, Platyrrhinus incarum LC
 Buffy broad-nosed bat, Platyrrhinus infuscus LC
 White-lined broad-nosed bat, Platyrrhinus lineatus LC
 Recife broad-nosed bat, Platyrrhinus recifinus LC
 Genus: Pygoderma
 Ipanema bat, Pygoderma bilabiatum LC
 Genus: Sphaeronycteris
 Visored bat, Sphaeronycteris toxophyllum DD
 Genus: Sturnira
 Little yellow-shouldered bat, Sturnira lilium LR/lc
 Greater yellow-shouldered bat, Sturnira magna
 Tilda's yellow-shouldered bat, Sturnira tildae LC
 Genus: Uroderma
 Tent-making bat, Uroderma bilobatum LR/lc
 Brown tent-making bat, Uroderma magnirostrum LR/lc
 Genus: Vampyressa
 Southern little yellow-eared bat, Vampyressa pusilla DD
 Northern little yellow-eared bat, Vampyressa thyone LC
 Genus: Vampyriscus
 Bidentate yellow-eared bat, Vampyriscus bidens LC
 Brock's yellow-eared bat, Vampyriscus brocki LC
 Genus: Vampyrodes
 Great stripe-faced bat, Vampyrodes caraccioli LC
 Family: Mormoopidae
 Genus: Pteronotus
 Big naked-backed bat, Pteronotus gymnonotus LR/lc
 Parnell's mustached bat, Pteronotus parnellii LR/lc
 Wagner's mustached bat, Pteronotus personatus LC
 Family: Noctilionidae
 Genus: Noctilio
 Lesser bulldog bat, Noctilio albiventris LC
 Greater bulldog bat, Noctilio leporinus LC
 Family: Furipteridae
 Genus: Furipterus
 Thumbless bat, Furipterus horrens LC
 Family: Thyropteridae
 Genus: Thyroptera
 De Vivo's disk-winged bat, Thyroptera devivoi
 Peters's disk-winged bat, Thyroptera discifera LC
 LaVal's disk-winged bat, Thyroptera lavali
 Spix's disk-winged bat, Thyroptera tricolor LC
 Patricia's disk-winged bat, Thyroptera wynneae
 Family: Natalidae
 Genus: Natalus
 Brazilian funnel-eared bat, Natalus macrourus LC
 Family: Molossidae
 Genus: Cynomops
 Cinnamon dog-faced bat, Cynomops abrasus DD
 Greenhall's dog-faced bat, Cynomops greenhalli
 Miller's dog-faced bat, Cynomops milleri
 Para dog-faced bat, Cynomops paranus DD
 Southern dog-faced bat, Cynomops planirostris LC
 Genus: Eumops
 Black bonneted bat, Eumops auripendulus LC
 Dwarf bonneted bat, Eumops bonariensis LC
 Eumops delticus
 Wagner's bonneted bat, Eumops glaucinus LC
 Sanborn's bonneted bat, Eumops hansae LC
 Guianan bonneted bat, Eumops maurus LC
 Patagonian bonneted bat, Eumops patagonicus LC
 Western bonneted bat, Eumops perotis LC
 Colombian bonneted bat, Eumops trumbulli LC
 Genus: Molossops
 Rufous dog-faced bat, Molossops neglectus DD
 Dwarf dog-faced bat, Molossops temminckii LC
 Genus: Molossus
 Aztec mastiff bat, Molossus aztecus
 Coiba mastiff bat, Molossus coibensis
 Bonda mastiff bat, Molossus currentium
 Velvety free-tailed bat, Molossus molossus LC
 Miller's mastiff bat, Molossus pretiosus
 Black mastiff bat, Molossus rufus LC
 Genus: Neoplatymops
 Mato Grosso dog-faced bat, Neoplatymops mattogrossensis LC
 Genus: Nyctinomops
 Peale's free-tailed bat, Nyctinomops aurispinosus LC
 Broad-eared bat, Nyctinomops laticaudatus LC
 Big free-tailed bat, Nyctinomops macrotis LC
 Genus: Promops
 Big crested mastiff bat, Promops centralis LC
 Brown mastiff bat, Promops nasutus LC
 Genus: Tadarida
 Brazilian free-tailed bat, Tadarida brasiliensis LC

 Family: Vespertilionidae
 Genus: Eptesicus
 Little black serotine, Eptesicu andinus
 Brazilian brown bat, Eptesicus brasiliensis LC
 Chiriquinan serotine, Eptesicus chiriquinus
 Diminutive serotine, Eptesicus diminutus DD
 Argentine brown bat, Eptesicus furinalis LC
 Taddei serotine, Eptesicus taddeii
 Genus: Histiotus
 Strange big-eared brown bat, Histiotus alienus DD
 Thomas's big-eared brown bat, Histiotus laephotis DD
 Small big-eared brown bat, Histiotus montanus DD
 Tropical big-eared brown bat, Histiotus velatus DD
 Genus: Lasiurus
 Desert red bat, Lasiurus blossevillii LC
 Tacarcuna bat, Lasiurus castaneus
 Hoary bat, Lasiurus cinereus LC
 Hairy-tailed bat, Lasiurus ebenus DD
 Southern yellow bat, Lasiurus ega LC
 Big red bat, Lasiurus egregius DD
 Saline red bat, Lasiurus salinae
 Genus: Rhogeessa
 Husson's yellow bat, Rhogeessa hussoni LC
 Thomas's yellow bat, Rhogeessa io LC
 Genus: Myotis
 Silver-tipped myotis, Myotis albescens LC
 Myotis dinellii
 Izecksohn's myotis, Myotis izecksohni
 LaVal's myotis, Myotis lavali
 Yellowish myotis, Myotis levis LC
 Black myotis, Myotis nigricans LR/lc
 Riparian myotis, Myotis riparius LC
 Red myotis, Myotis ruber NT
 Velvety myotis, Myotis simus DD

Order: Primates

 Family: Callitrichidae
 Genus: Callimico
 Goeldi's marmoset, Callimico goeldii VU
 Genus: Callithrix
 Buffy-tufted marmoset, Callithrix aurita VU
 Buffy-headed marmoset, Callithrix flaviceps EN
 White-headed marmoset, Callithrix geoffroyi LC
 Common marmoset, Callithrix jacchus LC
 Wied's marmoset, Callithrix kuhlii NT
 Black-tufted marmoset, Callithrix penicillata LC
 Genus: Cebuella
 Pygmy marmoset, Cebuella pygmaea LC
 Genus: Leontocebus
 Cruz Lima's saddle-back tamarin, Leontocebus cruzlimai LC
 Lesson's saddle-back tamarin, Leontocebus fuscus LC
 Brown-mantled tamarin, Leontocebus fuscicollis LC
 Black-mantled tamarin, Leontocebus nigricollis LC
 Weddell's saddle-back tamarin, Leontocebus weddelli LC
 Genus: Leontopithecus
 Superagui lion tamarin, Leontopithecus caissara CR
 Golden-headed lion tamarin, Leontopithecus chrysomelas EN
 Black lion tamarin, Leontopithecus chrysopygus EN
 Golden lion tamarin, Leontopithecus rosalia EN
 Genus: Mico
 Rio Acari marmoset, Mico acariensis DD
 Gold-and-white marmoset, Mico chrysoleucus DD
 Emilia's marmoset, Mico emiliae DD
 Santarem marmoset, Mico humeralifer DD
 Roosmalens' dwarf marmoset, Mico humilis VU
 Hershkovitz's marmoset, Mico intermedia LC
 White marmoset, Mico leucippe VU
 Manicore marmoset, Mico manicorensis LC
 Marca's marmoset, Mico marcai DD
 Maués marmoset, Mico mauesi LC
 Munduruku marmoset, Mico munduruku VU
Black-tailed marmoset, Mico melanurus LC
Black-headed marmoset, Mico nigriceps DD
Sateré marmoset, Mico saterei LC
 Genus: Saguinus
 Pied tamarin, Saguinus bicolor EN
 Emperor tamarin, Saguinus imperator LC
 Mottle-faced tamarin, Saguinus inustus LC
 White-lipped tamarin, Saguinus labiatus LC
 Martins's tamarin, Saguinus martinsi LC
 Red-handed tamarin, Saguinus midas LC
 Moustached tamarin, Saguinus mystax LC
 Black tamarin, Saguinus niger VU

 Family: Cebidae
 Genus: Cebus
 Humboldt's white-fronted capuchin, Cebus albifrons LC
 Kaapori capuchin, Cebus kaapori CR
 Spix's white-fronted capuchin, Cebus unicolor
 Wedge-capped capuchin, Cebus olivaceus LC
 Marañón white-fronted capuchin, Cebus yuracus
 Genus: Sapajus
 Tufted capuchin, Sapajus apella LC
 Black-striped capuchin, Sapajus libidinosus LC
 Large-headed capuchin, Sapajus macrocephalus LC
 Black capuchin, Sapajus nigritus NT
 Crested capuchin, Sapajus robustus EN
 Golden-bellied capuchin, Sapajus xanthosternos CR
 Genus: Saimiri
 Black-capped squirrel monkey, Saimiri boliviensis LC
 Collins' squirrel monkey, Saimiri collinsi
 Humboldt's squirrel monkey, Saimiri cassiquiarensis 
 Guianan squirrel monkey, Saimiri sciureus LC
 Bare-eared squirrel monkey, Saimiri ustus NT
 Black squirrel monkey, Saimiri vanzolinii VU
 Family: Aotidae
 Genus: Aotus
 Feline night monkey, Aotus azarae LC
 Nancy Ma's night monkey, Aotus nancymaae LC
 Black-headed night monkey, Aotus nigriceps LC
 Three-striped night monkey, Aotus trivirgatus LC
 Spix's night monkey, Aotus vociferans LC

 Family: Pitheciidae
 Genus: Cacajao
 Bald uakari, Cacajao calvus VU
 Black-headed uakari, Cacajao melanocephalus LC
 Aracá uakari, Cacajao ayresi VU
 Neblina uakari, Cacajao hosomi VU
 Genus: Callicebus
 Baptista Lake titi, Callicebus baptista LC
 Barbara Brown's titi, Callicebus barbarabrownae CR
 Prince Bernhard's titi, Callicebus bernhardi LC
 Brown titi, Callicebus brunneus LC
 Chestnut-bellied titi, Callicebus caligatus LC
 Ashy black titi, Callicebus cinerascens LC
 Coimbra Filho's titi, Callicebus coimbrai EN
 Coppery titi, Callicebus cupreus LC
 White-eared titi, Callicebus donacophilus LC
 Hershkovitz's titi, Callicebus dubius LC
 Hoffmanns's titi, Callicebus hoffmannsi LC
 Lucifer titi, Callicebus lucifer LC
 Black titi, Callicebus lugens LC
 Coastal black-handed titi, Callicebus melanochir VU
 Red-bellied titi, Callicebus moloch LC
 Black-fronted titi, Callicebus nigrifrons NT
 White-coated titi, Callicebus pallescens LC
 Atlantic titi, Callicebus personatus VU
 Rio Purus titi, Callicebus purinus LC
 Red-headed titi, Callicebus regulus LC
 Stephen Nash's titi, Callicebus stephennashi DD
 Collared titi, Callicebus torquatus LC
 Genus: Chiropotes
 White-nosed saki, Chiropotes albinasus EN
 Red-backed bearded saki, Chiropotes chiropotes LC
 Brown-backed bearded saki, Chiropotes israelita 
 Black bearded saki, Chiropotes satanas CR
 Uta Hick's bearded saki, Chiropotes utahicki EN
 Genus: Pithecia
 White-footed saki, Pithecia albicans VU
 Rio Tapajós saki, Pithecia irrorata LC
 Monk saki, Pithecia monachus LC
 White-faced saki, Pithecia pithecia

 Family: Atelidae
 Genus: Alouatta
 Red-handed howler, Alouatta belzebul VU
 Black howler, Alouatta caraya LC
 Brown howler, Alouatta guariba LC
 Amazon black howler, Alouatta nigerrima LC
 Venezuelan red howler, Alouatta seniculus LC
 Maranhão red-handed howler, Alouatta ululata EN
 Genus: Ateles
 White-fronted spider monkey, Ateles belzebuth EN
 Peruvian spider monkey, Ateles chamek EN
 White-cheeked spider monkey, Ateles marginatus EN
 Red-faced spider monkey, Ateles paniscus VU
 Genus: Brachyteles
 Southern muriqui, Brachyteles arachnoides EN
 Northern muriqui, Brachyteles hypoxanthus CR
 Genus: Lagothrix
 Gray woolly monkey, Lagothrix cana EN
 Brown woolly monkey, Lagothrix lagothricha VU
 Silvery woolly monkey, Lagothrix poeppigii VU

Order: Carnivora

Canidae - dogs, foxes, wolves
 Genus: Atelocynus
 Short-eared dog, A. microtis 
 Genus: Cerdocyon
 Crab-eating fox, C. thous
 Genus: Chrysocyon
 Maned wolf, C. brachyurus 
Genus: Dusicyon
 Dusicyon avus 
 Genus: Lycalopex
 Pampas fox, L. gymnocercus 
 Hoary fox, L. vetulus 
 Genus: Speothos
 Bush dog, S. venaticus

Felidae - cats
 Genus: Leopardus
Pampas cat L. colocola 
Geoffroy's cat L. geoffroyi 
Ocelot L. pardalis 
Oncilla L. tigrinus 
Margay L. wiedii 
 Genus: Herpailurus
Jaguarundi, H. yagouaroundi 
 Genus: Puma
Cougar, P. concolor 
 Genus: Panthera
Jaguar, P. onca

Mustelidae - otters, weasels and allies

Tayra, Eira barbara
Lesser grison, Galictis cuja
Greater grison, Galictis vittata
Neotropical river otter, Lontra longicaudis
Amazon weasel, Neogale africana
Long-tailed weasel, Neogale frenata
Giant otter, Pteronura brasiliensis

Mephitidae - skunks
Molina's hog-nosed skunk, Conepatus chinga
Striped hog-nosed skunk, Conepatus semistriatus

Otariidae - eared seals
South American fur seal, Arctocephalus australis
Subantarctic fur seal, Arctocephalus tropicalis
South American sea lion, Otaria flavescens

Phocidae - earless seals
Southern elephant seal, Mirounga leonina

Procyonidae - raccoons, coatis, olingos and allies

Eastern lowland olingo, Bassaricyon beddardi
South American coati, Nasua nasua
Kinkajou, Potos flavus
Crab-eating raccoon, Procyon cancrivorus

Cetacea

Balaenidae - right whales
Southern right whale, Eubalaena australis

Balaenopteridae - rorquals
Common minke whale, Balaenoptera acutorostrata
Antarctic minke whale, Balaenoptera bonaerensis
Sei whale, Balaenoptera borealis
Bryde's whale, Balaenoptera brydei
Omura's whale, Balaenoptera omurai (the second case found in Atlantic oceans)
Blue whale, Balaenoptera musculus
Fin whale, Balaenoptera physalus
Humpback whale, Megaptera novaeangliae

Delphinidae - dolphins

Long-beaked common dolphin, Delphinus capensis
Pygmy killer whale, Feresa attenuata
Short-finned pilot whale, Globicephala macrorhynchus
Long-finned pilot whale, Globicephala melas
Risso's dolphin, Grampus griseus
Fraser's dolphin, Lagenodelphis hosei
Southern right whale dolphin, Lissodelphis peronii
Killer whale, Orcinus orca
Melon-headed whale, Peponocephala electra
False killer whale, Pseudorca crassidens
Costero, Sotalia guianensis
Tucuxi, Sotalia fluviatilis
Pantropical spotted dolphin, Stenella attenuata
Clymene dolphin, Stenella clymene
Striped dolphin, Stenella coeruleoalba
Spinner dolphin, Stenella longirostris
Rough-toothed dolphin, Steno bredanensis
Common bottlenose dolphin, Tursiops truncatus

Phocoenidae - porpoises
Burmeister's porpoise, Phocoena spinipinnis
Spectacled porpoise, Phocoena dioptrica

Physeteridae
Sperm whale, Physeter macrocephalus

Iniidae - South American river dolphins

Amazon river dolphin, Inia geoffrensis
Araguaian river dolphin, Inia araguaiaensis

Pontoporiidae - La Plata dolphin
La Plata dolphin, Pontoporia blainvillei

Ziphiidae - beaked whales
Arnoux's beaked whale, Berardius arnuxii
Southern bottlenose whale, Hyperoodon planifrons
Blainville's beaked whale, Mesoplodon densirostris
Hector's beaked whale, Mesoplodon hectori
Cuvier's beaked whale, Ziphius cavirostris

Sirenia

Trichechidae - manatees
Amazonian manatee, Trichechus inunguis
West Indian manatee, Trichechus manatus
Dwarf manatee, Trichechus pygmaeus

Perissodactyla

Tapiridae - tapirs

Brazilian tapir, Tapirus terrestris
Kabomani tapir, Tapirus kabomani

Artiodactyla

Suidae - pigs
Feral hog, Sus scrofa (introduced species)

Tayassuidae - peccaries

Collared peccary, Dicotyles tajacu
Giant peccary, Pecari maximus
White-lipped peccary, Tayassu pecari

Cervidae - deer

Chital or axis deer, Axis axis (introduced species)
Marsh deer, Blastocerus dichotomus
Red brocket, Mazama americana
Gray brocket, Mazama gouazoubira
Pygmy brocket, Mazama nana
White-tailed deer, Odocoileus virginianus
Pampas deer, Ozotoceros bezoarticus

Rodentia

Sciuridae - squirrels

Amazon dwarf squirrel, Microsciurus flaviventer
Neotropical pygmy squirrel, Sciurillus pusillus
Brazilian squirrel, Sciurus aestuans
Yellow-throated squirrel, Sciurus gilvigularis
Bolivian squirrel, Sciurus ignitus
Northern Amazon red squirrel, Sciurus igniventris
Southern Amazon red squirrel, Sciurus spadiceus

Myocastoridae

Nutria, Myocastor coypus

Muridae - Old World rats and allies
Norway rat, Rattus norvegicus (introduced species)
Black rat, Rattus rattus (introduced species)
House mouse, Mus musculus (introduced species)

Cricetidae - New World rats and allies

Abrawayaomys chebezi
Ruschi's rat, Abrawayaomys ruschii
Azara's grass mouse, Akodon azarae
Cursor grass mouse, Akodon cursor
Lindbergh's grass mouse, Akodon lindberghi
Montane grass mouse, Akodon montensis
Caparaó grass mouse, Akodon mystax
Paraná grass mouse, Akodon paranaensis
Reig's grass mouse, Akodon reigi
Sao Paulo grass mouse, Akodon sanctipaulensis
Serra do Mar grass mouse, Akodon serrensis
Large-lipped crimson-nosed rat, Bibimys labiosus
Brazilian shrew mouse, Blarinomys breviceps
Gray-bellied brucie, Brucepattersonius griserufescens
Red-bellied brucie, Brucepattersonius igniventris
Ihering's hocicudo, Brucepattersonius iheringi
Soricine brucie, Brucepattersonius soricinus
Large vesper mouse, Calomys callosus
Calomys cerqueirai
Small vesper mouse, Calomys laucha
Delicate vesper mouse, Calomys tener
Tocantins vesper mouse, Calomys tocantinsi
Cerradomys langguthi
Cerradomys maracajuensis
Marinho's oryzomys, Cerradomys marinhus
Lindbergh’s oryzomys, Cerradomys scotti
Terraced rice rat, Cerradomys subflavus
Cerradomys vivoi
Montane Atlantic Forest rat, Delomys collinus
Striped Atlantic Forest rat, Delomys dorsalis
Pallid Atlantic Forest rat, Delomys sublineatus
Drymoreomys albimaculatus
Emmons's rice rat, Euryoryzomys emmonsae
Buffy-sided oryzomys, Euryoryzomys lamia
MacConnell's rice rat, Euryoryzomys macconnelli
Elegant rice rat, Euryoryzomys nitidus
Russet rice rat, Euryoryzomys russatus
Gray leaf-eared mouse, Graomys griseoflavus
Web-footed marsh rat, Holochilus brasiliensis
Amazonian marsh rat, Holochilus sciureus
Atlantic Forest oryzomys, Hylaeamys laticeps
Azara's broad-headed oryzomys, Hylaeamys megacephalus
Sowbug rice rat, Hylaeamys oniscus
Western Amazonian oryzomys, Hylaeamys perenensis
Yungas rice rat, Hylaeamys yunganus
Juliomys anoblepas (extinct)
Juliomys ossitenuis
Lesser Wilfred's mouse, Juliomys pictipes
Cleft-headed juliomys, Juliomys rimofrons
Aracuaria Forest tree mouse, Juliomys ximenezi 
Juscelinomys candango (extinct)
Juscelinomys talpinus
Molelike mouse, Juscelinomys vulpinus
Woolly giant rat, Kunsia tomentosus
Lund's amphibious rat, Lundomys molitor
Transitional colilargo, Microakodontomys transitorius
Dubost's bristly mouse, Neacomys dubosti
Guiana bristly mouse, Neacomys guianae
Jurua bristly mouse, Neacomys minutus
Musser’s neacomys, Neacomys musseri
Paracou neacomys, Neacomys paracou
Common neacomys, Neacomys spinosus
Narrow-footed bristly mouse, Neacomys tenuipes
Hairy-tailed bolo mouse, Necromys lasiurus
Small-footed bristly mouse, Nectomys rattus
Scaly-footed water rat, Nectomys squamipes
Guianan arboreal rice rat, Oecomys auyantepui
Bicolored arboreal rice rat, Oecomys bicolor
Cleber's arboreal rice rat, Oecomys cleberi
Unicolored arboreal rice rat, Oecomys concolor
Mamore arboreal rice rat, Oecomys mamorae
Brazilian arboreal rice rat, Oecomys paricola
King arboreal rice rat, Oecomys rex
Robert's arboreal rice rat, Oecomys roberti
Trinidad arboreal rice rat, Oecomys trinitatis
Chacoan pygmy rice rat, Oligoryzomys chacoensis
Yellow pygmy rice rat, Oligoryzomys flavescens
Fulvous pygmy rice rat, Oligoryzomys fulvescens
Small-eared pygmy rice rat, Oligoryzomys microtis
Oligoryzomys moojeni
Black-footed pygmy rice rat, Oligoryzomys nigripes
Oligoryzomys rupestris
Straw-colored pygmy rice rat, Oligoryzomys stramineus
Amazonian hocicudo, Oxymycterus amazonicus
Angular hocicudo, Oxymycterus angularis
Caparaó hocicudo, Oxymycterus caparaoe
Hispid hocicudo, Oxymycterus hispidus
Long-nosed hocicudo, Oxymycterus nasutus
Robert's hocicudo, Oxymycterus roberti
Red hocicudo, Oxymycterus rufus
Rio de Janeiro arboreal rat, Phaenomys ferrugineus
Brazilian false rice rat, Pseudoryzomys simplex
Brazilian arboreal mouse, Rhagomys rufescens
Gardner's climbing mouse, Rhipidomys gardneri
White-footed climbing mouse, Rhipidomys leucodactylus
MacConnell's climbing mouse, Rhipidomys macconnelli
Atlantic Forest climbing mouse, Rhipidomys mastacalis
Splendid climbing mouse, Rhipidomys nitela
Waterhouse's swamp rat, Scapteromys tumidus
Ucayali spiny mouse, Scolomys ucayalensis
Alston's cotton rat, Sigmodon alstoni
Paraguayan rice rat, Sooretamys angouya
Cerrado mouse, Thalpomys cerradensis
Hairy-eared cerrado mouse, Thalpomys lasiotis
Blackish grass mouse, Thaptomys nigrita
Cerrado red-nosed mouse, Wiedomys cerradensis
Red-nosed mouse, Wiedomys pyrrhorhinos
Greater Wilfred's mouse, Wilfredomys oenax
Short-tailed cane rat, Zygodontomys brevicauda

Erethizontidae - New World porcupines
Bristle-spined porcupine, Chaetomys subspinosus
Bahia porcupine, Coendou insidiosus
Black-tailed hairy dwarf porcupine, Coendou melanurus
Black dwarf porcupine, Coendou nycthemera
Brazilian porcupine, Coendou prehensilis
Roosmalen's dwarf porcupine, Coendou roosmalenorum
Paraguaian hairy dwarf porcupine, Coendou spinosus

Dinomyidae
Pacarana, Dinomys branickii

Caviidae - guinea pigs and cavies

Brazilian guinea pig, Cavia aperea
Shiny guinea pig, Cavia fulgida
Santa Catarina's guinea pig, Cavia intermedia
Greater guinea pig, Cavia magna
Guinea pig, Cavia porcellus
Yellow-toothed cavy, Galea flavidens
Spix's yellow-toothed cavy, Galea spixii
Acrobatic cavy, Kerodon acrobata
Rock cavy, Kerodon rupestris

Hydrochaeridae

Capybara, Hydrochaeris hydrochaeris

Dasyproctidae - agoutis and acouchis
Azara's agouti, Dasyprocta azarae
Black agouti, Dasyprocta fuliginosa
Red-rumped agouti, Dasyprocta leporina
Black-rumped agouti, Dasyprocta prymnolopha
Central American agouti, Dasyprocta punctata
Red acouchi, Myoprocta acouchy
Green acouchi, Myoprocta pratti

Cuniculidae
Lowland paca, Cuniculus paca

Ctenomyidae - tuco-tucos
Brazilian tuco-tuco, Ctenomys brasiliensis
Flamarion's tuco-tuco, Ctenomys flammarioni
Tiny tuco-tuco, Ctenomys minutus
Natterer's tuco-tuco, Ctenomys nattereri
Rondon's tuco-tuco, Ctenomys rondoni
Collared tuco-tuco, Ctenomys torquatus

Echimyidae - spiny rats and allies
Painted tree-rat, Callistomys pictus
Owl's spiny rat, Carterodon sulcidens
Bishop's fossorial spiny rat, Clyomys bishopi
Broad-headed spiny rat, Clyomys laticeps
Bolivian bamboo rat, Dactylomys boliviensis
Amazon bamboo rat, Dactylomys dactylinus
White-faced spiny tree-rat, Echimys chrysurus
Giant tree-rat, Toromys grandis
Brandt's guiara, Euryzygomatomys guiara
Fischer's guiara, Euryzygomatomys spinosus
Yellow-crowned brush-tailed rat, Isothrix bistriata
Rio Negro brush-tailed rat, Isothrix negrensis
Plain brush-tailed rat, Isothrix pagurus
Atlantic bamboo rat, Kannabateomys amblyonyx
Tuft-tailed spiny tree-rat, Lonchothrix emiliae
Long-tailed armored tree-rat, Makalata macrura
Ferreira's spiny tree-rat, Mesomys hispidus
Tufted-tailed spiny tree-rat, Mesomys occultus
Pará spiny tree-rat, Mesomys stimulax
Golden Atlantic tree-rat, Phyllomys blainvilii
Orange-brown Atlantic tree-rat, Phyllomys brasiliensis
Drab Atlantic tree-rat, Phyllomys dasythrix
Kerr's Atlantic tree-rat, Phyllomys kerri
Pallid Atlantic tree-rat, Phyllomys lamarum
Lund's Atlantic tree-rat, Phyllomys lundi
Mantiqueira Atlantic tree-rat, Phyllomys mantiqueirensis
Long-furred Atlantic tree-rat, Phyllomys medius
Black-spined Atlantic tree-rat, Phyllomys nigrispinus
Rusty-sided Atlantic tree-rat, Phyllomys pattoni
Giant Atlantic tree-rat, Phyllomys thomasi
Short-furred Atlantic tree-rat, Phyllomys unicolor
Napo spiny rat, Proechimys quadruplicatus
Short-tailed spiny rat, Proechimys brevicauda
Guyenne spiny rat, Proechimys guyannensis
Cuvier's spiny rat, Proechimys cuvieri
Stiff-spine spiny rat, Proechimys echinothrix
Gardner's spiny rat, Proechimys gardneri
Goeldi's spiny rat, Proechimys goeldii
Guyanan spiny rat, Proechimys hoplomyoides
Kulina spiny rat, Proechimys kulinae
Long-tailed spiny rat, Proechimys longicaudatus
Mouse-tailed Atlantic spiny rat, Proechimys myosuros
Roberto's spiny rat, Proechimys roberti
Patton's spiny rat, Proechimys pattoni
Napo spiny rat, Proechimys quadruplicatus
Simon's spiny rat, Proechimys simonsi
Steere's spiny rat, Proechimys steerei
Common punaré, Thrichomys apereoides
White-spined Atlantic spiny rat, Trinomys albispinus
Soft-spined Atlantic spiny rat, Trinomys dimidiatus
Elias's Atlantic spiny rat, Trinomys eliasi
Gracile Atlantic spiny rat, Trinomys gratiosus
Ihering's Atlantic spiny rat, Trinomys iheringi
Dark-caped Atlantic spiny rat, Trinomys mirapitanga
Moojen's Atlantic spiny rat, Trinomys moojeni
Spiked Atlantic spiny rat, Trinomys paratus
Hairy Atlantic spiny rat, Trinomys setosus
Yonenaga's Atlantic spiny rat, Trinomys yonenagae

Lagomorpha

Leporidae - rabbits and hares

Common tapetí, Sylvilagus brasiliensis
Coastal tapetí, Sylvilagus tapetillus
European hare, Lepus europaeus (introduced species)

See also
List of amphibians of Brazil
List of birds of Brazil
List of reptiles of Brazil
List of mammal genera
Lists of mammals by region
Wildlife of Brazil

References

 Costa, L.P. et al. 2005. Mammal Conservation in Brazil. Conservation Biology 19 (3), pp. 672–679.
 Moratelli, R., Dias, D. 2015. A new species of nectar-feeding bat, genus Lonchophylla, from the Caatinga of Brazil (Chiroptera, Phyllostomidae). ZooKeys 514, pp. 73–91.
 Nogueira, M.R. et al. 2014. Checklist of Brazilian bats, with comments on original records. Check List 10 (4), pp. 808–821.
 Rocha, P.A. et al. 2015. First record of Salvin's big-eyed bat Chiroderma salvini Dobson, 1878 for Brazil. Mammalia (in press).
 natureserve.org